The 2000–01 Meistriliiga season was the 11th season of the Meistriliiga, the top level of ice hockey in Estonia. Four teams participated in the league, and HK Narva 2000 won the championship.

Standings

External links
Season on hockeyarchives.info

Meistriliiga
Meist
Meistriliiga (ice hockey) seasons